The Journal of Negro Education was a quarterly peer-reviewed academic journal published by Howard University, established in 1932 by Charles Henry Thompson, who was its editor-in-chief for more than 30 years. The journal's aim is to identify and define the problems that characterize the education of Black people in the United States and elsewhere, to provide a forum for analysis and solutions, and to serve as a vehicle for sharing statistics and research on a national basis. Ivory A. Toldson has served as editor-in-chief since 2008.

The journal listed three aims as its mission: first, to stimulate the collection and facilitate the dissemination of facts about the education of Black people; second, to present discussions involving critical appraisals of the proposals and practices relating to the education of Black people; and third, to stimulate and sponsor investigations of issues incident to the education of Black people.

Notable contributors in the fields of education, sociology, history, and other disciplines over the years have included Horace Mann Bond, Ralph J. Bunche, Kenneth B. Clark, James P. Comer, W. E. B. Du Bois, E. Franklin Frazier, Edmund W. Gordon, Robert J. Havighurst, Dorothy Height, Dwight O. W. Holmes, Charles S. Johnson, Alain Locke, Thurgood Marshall, Benjamin E. Mays, James Nabrit, Jr., Dorothy B. Porter, and others.

References

External links 

)

Publications established in 1932
African Americans and education
Black studies publications
Quarterly journals
English-language journals
Education journals
Howard University
1932 establishments in Washington, D.C.